Henderson Smaller Companies Investment Trust is a large British investment trust dedicated to investments in smaller companies. Established in March 1955, the company is listed on the London Stock Exchange and is a constituent of the FTSE 250 Index. The chairman is Jamie Cayzer-Colvin.

References

External links
 Official site

Financial services companies established in 1955
Investment trusts of the United Kingdom
Companies listed on the London Stock Exchange